The discography of Gippy Grewal consists of 12 studio albums, 42 singles and 108 soundtracks.

Studio albums

Singles

As lead artist

As featured artist

Film soundtrack

Punjabi

Hindi

References

Discographies of Indian artists